Jordan David Steen (born 26 June 1991) is a Canadian freestyle wrestler. In March 2020, he qualified to represent Canada at the 2020 Summer Olympics at the 2020 Pan American Wrestling Olympic Qualification Tournament held in Ottawa, Canada.

Career 

He represented Canada at the 2013 Summer Universiade in Kazan, Russia without winning a medal.

In 2017, he won one of the bronze medals in the 86kg event at the Pan American Wrestling Championships held in Salvador, Brazil.

In 2018, he won one of the bronze medals in the 97kg event at the Commonwealth Games held in Gold Coast, Australia. Later that year, he also won one of the bronze medals in the 97kg event at the 2018 Pan American Wrestling Championships held in Lima, Peru.

He competed in the men's freestyle 97kg event at the 2019 Pan American Games, also held in Lima, Peru, without winning a medal. He lost his first match against José Daniel Díaz of Venezuela and also lost his bronze medal match against Luis Miguel Pérez of the Dominican Republic.

Achievements

References

External links 
 

1991 births
Living people
Canadian male sport wrestlers
Wrestlers at the 2018 Commonwealth Games
Commonwealth Games medallists in wrestling
Commonwealth Games bronze medallists for Canada
Wrestlers at the 2019 Pan American Games
Pan American Games competitors for Canada
Sportspeople from Ottawa
Wrestlers at the 2020 Summer Olympics
Olympic wrestlers of Canada
21st-century Canadian people
Medallists at the 2018 Commonwealth Games